Barrett Dam is a concrete arch-gravity dam in southern San Diego County, California in the United States, forming Barrett Lake on Cottonwood Creek. The dam is part of the city of San Diego's local water supply system.

Overview and operations
The dam contains  of concrete. The spillway is located on the face of the dam and is a stepped overflow structure controlled by gates. To prevent flash floods from overtopping the dam, the gates are left open during the rainy season from November 1 to April 1.

Water stored at Lower Otay passes through the Otay Water Treatment Plant before entering the municipal system. Because Barrett is a deeper and narrower lake than Morena and experiences less evaporation, the city prioritizes water storage in Barrett. Water is moved downstream from Morena as long as storage space is available in Barrett. Resultantly, Barrett Lake is usually at a high level except during periods of extended drought.

History
Before there was a reservoir, the area was a valley that has been homesteaded by George Barrett in the 1870s. In 1913, the city of San Diego purchased this development for $2.5 million. Flooding in 1916 (ostensibly the work of the "rainmaker" Charles Hatfield) broke the dam at Lower Otay and overflowed the upstream Morena Dam, demonstrating the need for additional water storage capacity.

The city began construction on Barrett Dam in 1919, under the direction of engineer Hiram N. Savage. In December of that year, unusually heavy rainfall filled the reservoir behind the incomplete dam, very nearly causing its failure. Over the following few months, construction was hurried in order to keep up with the rising lake, which was only held back by wooden flashboards as the water level actually exceeded the height of the poured concrete for most of the construction period. Temporary sluiceways had to be maintained in order to drain excess water from the lake, which consistently threatened to overtop the dam. By the time the dam was completed in 1923 it was said that "the value of the water stored behind Barrett Dam by the time the structure was completed exceeded the entire cost of the dam".

Recreation
In order to protect water quality, recreational access to Barrett Lake is extremely limited. The lake is open only Wednesdays, Saturdays and Sundays, and visitors are required to take reservations. Fishing is allowed on a strict catch-and-release basis.

References

External links
Daily water levels table for Barrett and other San Diego County lakes

Dams in California
Dams completed in 1923
Arch-gravity dams
United States local public utility dams
1923 establishments in California